The Campground Historic District, also known as The Campground is a historic district in the city of Mobile, Alabama, United States. Named for the Old Camp Ground, a military encampment that occupied the property during the American Civil War, this historically African-American neighborhood was placed on the National Register of Historic Places on July 7, 2005. It is roughly bounded by Martin Luther King Jr. Avenue, Rylands Street, St. Stephens Road, and Ann Street. The houses range from shotgun houses to bungalows and date from the late 19th century to the middle 20th century.

References

Historic districts in Mobile, Alabama
National Register of Historic Places in Mobile, Alabama
African American Heritage Trail of Mobile
Neoclassical architecture in Alabama
Queen Anne architecture in Alabama
Historic districts on the National Register of Historic Places in Alabama